The Hopevale Martyrs were Christian martyrs who died during the World War II in the present day Hopevale, Aglinab, Tapaz, Capiz, Philippines. The martyrs were Jennie Clare Adams, Prof. James Howard Covell, Charma Moore Covell, Dorothy Antoinette Dowell, Signe Amelia Erikson, Dr. Frederick Willer Meyer, Ruth Violet (Schatch) Meyer, Dr. Francis Howard Rose, Gertrude Coombs Rose, Rev. Erle Frederich Rounds, Louise Cummings Rounds, and Erle Douglas. There were also three children, one name Erle Rounds Jr, were also bayoneted. Despite the order that these Americans should go home because of the war, they refused to leave their mission and eventually offered their lives when they were caught by the enemies.

During the Japanese invasion of the Philippines, the eleven American Baptist missionaries refused to surrender to the Japanese troops. The martyrs took refuge in the mountains of Barrio Katipunan, Tapaz, Capiz. They hid in the forest they call "Hopevale" with the help of their Filipino friends.

On December 19, 1943, Hopevale fell into Japanese hands. The martyrs begged to free the Filipino captives and instead offered themselves as ransom. At the dawn of December 20, 1943, the missionaries asked to be allowed to pray and, an hour later, they told their Japanese captors they were ready to die. The adults were beheaded and the children were bayoneted.

Memorial

There is a cross marker on top of the common grave of these martyrs in Hopevale near the place where they were executed. A replica of this marker also stands at Central Philippine University. There is also a plaque on the campus of CPU as well.

Legacy
No Greater Love; Triumph and Sacrifice of American Baptist Missionaries During WW II Philippines, and the Martyrdom in Hopevale by Elmo D. Familiaran, Ann Qualls and Wilma Rugh Taylor was published in 2007.

The complete Hopevale story is chronicled in The Edge of Terror, by Baptist minister Scott Walker.

A two-act musical drama titled Hopevale: Memories of Missions and Martyrs was staged in honor of the martyrs during the centennial celebrations of the founding of Central Philippine University in 2005. The musical was written by Rodolfo Cabado, an alumnus of the university.

Hopevale Church in Saginaw, Michigan takes its name from the Hopevale Martyrs.

Parchment Valley, the West Virginia Baptist Conference Center in Ripley, West Virginia hosts a replica of the Hopevale Chapel. It is built at the end of a trail with wind chimes honoring each of the Hopevale Martyrs.

Another replica of the Hopevale Chapel can be found on the grounds of Green Lake Conference Center in Green Lake, Wisconsin.

References

History of the Philippines (1898–1946)
History of Capiz
Visayan history
20th-century Christian martyrs